The 2016 Osnabrück Football Summer was a summer football friendly tournament organized by VfL Osnabrück and Match IQ. All matches were played at hosts Osnabrück's Osnatel-Arena, they were joined by Borussia Mönchengladbach (Germany), Cardiff City (England) and FC St. Pauli (Germany).

Overview
All matches lasted 60 minutes. Games that ended in a draw after 60 minutes were decided by a penalty shoot-out.

Participants

Standings
The tournament included four sixty-minute matches, with a penalty shoot-out deciding any games that ended level.

Matches

Goalscorers

Media coverage

References

External links 

2016–17 in English football
2016–17 in German football
2016–17 in Welsh football